The Gastlosen (local  ) are a mountain range of the Swiss Prealps, lying between the cantons of Fribourg, Bern and Vaud. They form a  chain stretching from Jaun to Rougemont, culminating at the Dent de Savigny, elevation , just south-west of the Dent de Ruth, where the three cantonal borders meet.

The Trophée des Gastlosen is a competition of ski mountaineering which takes place in the area.

References
Swisstopo topographic maps (1:25,000)

External links
Tour of the Gastlosen mountains, la-gruyère.ch

Mountain ranges of the Alps
Mountain ranges of Switzerland
Fribourg–Vaud border
Bern–Vaud border
Bern–Fribourg border